Hassan Najmi (born on March 7, 1960) is a Moroccan poet. Born in Ben Ahmed.  

His first book of poems Lavenders’ Princedom came out in 1982. Although his early work shows the influence of poets such as Ahmed Mejjati, Mohammed Serghini and Abdelkarim Tabbal, his poetry has since evolved along its own path. 

He is President of the Union of Moroccan Writers (1998-2005). 

A selection of his poetry has been translated into English by Mbarek Sryfi and Eric Sellin under the title The Blueness of the Evening: Selected Poems of Hassan Najmi. His novel Gertrude has also been translated by Roger Allen.

See also 

 Modern Arabic literature
 Moroccan literature
 Arabic poetry

References

Moroccan male poets
1959 births
Living people